Creo en Dios ("I Believe in God") is a 1941 Mexican film. It was directed by 
Fernando de Fuentes.

External links
 

1941 films
1940s Spanish-language films
Films directed by Fernando de Fuentes
Mexican black-and-white films
Mexican crime drama films
1941 crime drama films
1940s Mexican films